Cyril Tudor Fernando (28 January 1921 – 17 October 1977; Sinhala: සිරිල් ටියුඩර් ප්‍රනාන්දු), popularly known as C.T. Fernando, was a Sri Lankan singer and composer. One of the most popular singers in Sri Lankan music often known as the First Pop singer in Sri Lanka, Fernando was praised by critics for the themes and wording of his songs like "Vana Bamaru," "Bilinda Nelwa Ukule" and "Rosa Male." His other popular songs include "Lo Ada Ninde", "Gile Male Tarawa" and "Mariya Mawu Kuse."

Personal life 
Fernando was born on 28 January 1921 in Uyana Road, Dehiwela, Sri Lanka. He later grew up in Nawalapitiya. He educated at St. Mary's College, Nawalpitiya. As a student C.T. showed interest in the arts participating in school dramas and singing with the local church choir.

Fernando met his future wife Dhanawathie (Dhana) Gunasekara in 1951. Dhana was born in Badulla and studied at Badulla Girls' High School. She fell in love with CT's voice. Her favourite song was "Pin Siduwanne". She wrote love letters to CT. He also fell in love with her. CT and Dhana got married secretly from their parents with the help of Latha Walpola despite strong opposition from her parents. The couple had one son: Priyantha, who was born in 1952.

On 17 October 1977, Fernando had participated in a concert and had come home on foot from Dehiwala Junction around midnight. He informed that his has a mild chest pain. Then his wife called the neighbor Ivo Martins and took him to the Kalubowila Hospital. He died on the same day after become unconscious at the hospital at the age of 56 by a heart attack. His wife Dhana died on September 25, 2012.

His son Priyantha Fernando was also a popular singer in Sri Lanka who continued with CT's legacy. Priyantha and his wife Piyaseeli have two sons, Conrad Tisara Fernando (CT Junior) and Danushka Ryan Fernando. In April 2018, Priyantha fell ill during a concert in Italy and later returned to Sri Lanka and was being treated at the Kalubowila Hospital. He died on 1 May 2018 at the age of 65 while receiving treatments.

Early career 
Fernando often won prizes for elocution, singing and drama, including a gold medal of oratory. He was a chorister in his local parish church, and later became the choir master of A.R.P. Messenger service in Colombo between 1942 and 1965. He later joined the Grand Cabaret to entertain the troops involved in world war 2 and further developed his musical talents.

In 1946, Fernando successfully auditioned for a position as grade one radio artist on Radio Ceylon. His first radio song was Sawas Kala Aele. Then he had his first popular song with "Pin Sindu Wanne," a plea to children to stop harming birds. The song was written by R. N. H. Perera.

Commercial artist
In 1952 Fernando branched out as a commercial artist signing with HMV subsidiary Cargills Company. The melody of many of his songs are his own creations. Many of these songs got inspiration from western songs. He recorded many of his popular songs with the label including "Pinsiduwanne", "Suwanda Rosa", "Bara Bage", "Ambilimame", "Lo Ada Ninde", "Gilimale Taruwa", "Kimada Sumihiriye", "Amba Ruk" and "Bilinda Nelawe Ukule". The song "Berena Pini Bindu" is said to be influenced by a Polish song. The song "Salalihini Kovul Handa" got the accent of English song and the song "Sigiri Sukumaliye" became the first Sinhala song to be composed in the rhythm of the Bosanova. The song "Ranwan Ran Kendi Pirala" is the first Sinhala 'Rock and Roll' song.

From 1959 to 1960, Fernando was rated the most popular singer in the country. He continued his recording career recording the LP "The Golden Voice of C.T. Fernando" with the Lewis Brown company. Popular Songs such as "Hela Jathika Abhimane","Ma Bala Kale", "Sandhawata Ran Tharu","Ane Dingak", "Piyumehi Peni bothi","Punsadha Hinehenne" a Duet with Rukmani Devi, "Sihina lowe", "Awadhiwanna" and "Mage sudhu Mame" were included in this album. The Original Music arrangements and Direction for these songs in the album were done by the renowned musician Patrick Denipitiya. These recordings featured lyrics by Lalith S. Maithripala, Karunaratne Abeysekera, Sarath Wimalaweera and Wimaladasa Perera.The music for some of his songs were composed by Fernando himself in addition to B. S. Perera and Patrick Denipitiya.

Fernando recorded a popular duet, "Pun Sanda Hinahenne," with Rukmani Devi. Another duet, "Selalihini Kovul Handa," was done with Latha Walpola. Most of his duets were sung together with Rukmani Devi and Latha Walpola as well as Chandra de Silva. He was the first Sri Lankan Artist to tour overseas with Music Director "Patrick Denipitiya and his Combo" in 1967 performing at various venues in UK, France, Italy, Switzerland, Spain and other Europe destinations during a period of 6 months. Meanwhile from 1960 to 1966, he was featured in the “Little Hut” at the Mount Lavinia Hotel. Then he featured at the “Coconut Grove” at the Galle Face Hotel. Then he became the first Ceylonese singer to perform at the Commonwealth Institute in London. Meanwhile he made hugely successful EP record titled "Sigiri Sukumaliye" with Silverline in 1975.

Cinema career
Apart from singing, Fernando also acted in a few Sinhala films such as Deyiyange Rate and Gamperaliya directed by Lester James Peries. He sang a popular Virindu song in the 1958 film Deyyange Rate. In the film Gamperaliya, he played the role of matchmaker. In 1947, he played the role of a villager in the play Sirisangabo produced by J. D. A. Perera. In addition, he sang the song "Mara Dadenek" in the new production of John de Silva's play Sri Wickrama and acted in the play Vidura produced by Chitrasena.

CT's popular film song Mee Wadayaki Jeewithe was sung to the movie Kawuda Hari in 1969. The song was composed by Karunaratne Abeysekara and the music is composed by Sisira Senaratne. A song he sung at the Ananda Festival in the film Nimwalalla in 1970 created by school children at Ananda College was recorded by CT.

Track listing 

 Adada Eeye Wage
 Amathannata Haki 
 Ambaruk Sevanalle 
 Ambili Mame 
 Anantha Gee 
 Ane Dingak Innako 
 Api Avidimu Handapane
 Asaranaya Dugee (Film: Hathara Maha Nidhanaya) 
 Atha Weeriyen 
 Awadiwanna Awadiwanna 
 Bara Bage
 Berena Pani Bidu 
 Bilinda Nalawena 
 Dawasa Gevee 
 Dilindu Pale 
 Etha Kandu Rali (with C.D. Fonseka) (Film: Sangawunu Menika) 
 Gatha Sitha Samakarala 
 Geevana Mihire 
 Hela Jathika Abhimane 
 Jesu Rajaaneni (with Latha Walpola) 
 Kale Mala Nowe 
 Kalu Mahawali 
 Kimada Sumihiriye 
 Koheda Ane 
 Kowulange Mihiri 
 Kusaguru Muthu Wal (Film: Nim Walalla) 
 Laksha Ganan (Film: Sarawita) (with Anton Rodrigo) 
 Lo Ada Ninde 
 Ma Bala Kale 
 Ma Hada Sihil 
 Ma Oba Hamu Wu (with Rukmani Devi) 
 Ma Sukumali 
 Mage Sudu Mame 
 Mal Bara Himidiriye (with Latha Walpola) 
 Mal Loke Rani 
 Mal Sara Pem 
 Mee Amba Wanaye (Film: Pem Kurulloo) 
 Mee Wadayaki Jeewithe (Film: Kawuda Hari) 
 Nisala Rae (with Latha Walpola) 
 Onchili Chili 
 Paravunu Mal 
 Pinsidu Wanne (with Suriya Rani) 
 Piyumehi Pani Bothi 
 Prayamaye Sihina
 Punsanda Hinahenne (with Rukmani Devi) 
 Rae Pal Rakala 
 Rae Tharu Babalanawa (with Anjaleen Gunathilake)
 Rana Monarai 
 Ranwan Ran Kendi 
 Salalihini Kowul Handa
 Saman Devi Pihiten (with Anjaleen Gunathilake) (Film: Deyyanne Ratey)  
 Saman Kakulu 
 Sandawata Rantharu 
 Santhose Paedenna 
 Sarungaley Sarungaley  
 Seetha Raeye (with Latha Walpola) 
 Selalihini Kowul (with Latha Walpola) 
 Senakeliye Maa 
 Sihina Lowe 
 Soobanalu Kolamba (Film: Hathara Maha Nidhanaya]]) 
 Sundara Soobana (with Rukmani Devi) 
 Sunila Waralasa 
 Suwanda Rosa Mal 
 Vana Bambaro 
 Wassak Enawa (with Pushparani Ariyaratne)

Notes

References

External links
 CT Fernando Guitar Chords

20th-century Sri Lankan male singers
People from Moratuwa
Sri Lankan Roman Catholics
1977 deaths

1921 births
Sinhalese singers